Michael Vladimir Klesic (born July 31, 1975) is an American actor.

Klesic was born in Tarzana, California. He was raised mostly in Los Angeles and attended Beverly Hills High School in Beverly Hills, California. He graduated from the Guildford School of Acting in England.

His first roles came to him when he was just 18 playing bit parts in Clueless, Dangerous Minds, and a football player in Forrest Gump.  He then left the front of the camera to work behind the scenes on a number of films and TV shows.  In 2000 he returned to his first love and ended up going to drama school in England.  He graduated in 2003 and his first "in front of the camera" work upon returning to acting came shortly after with A Wonderful Night in Split which was directed by Arsen Anton Ostojić. He went on to work on Children of Men with Alfonso Cuaron and has recently been seen as a people smuggler in Murphy's Law.

External links

 

1975 births
American male film actors
Living people
People from Tarzana, Los Angeles